Robertus Petrus van der Laan (born 5 September 1968) is a Dutch football manager of Northern Premier League Division One South club Newcastle Town, and a former player.

He began his playing career in his native the Netherlands with Eerste Divisie club Schiedamse Voetbal Vereniging in 1987, before moving on to Wageningen in 1990. In 1991, he moved to England to play for Port Vale, where after four seasons as one of the club's key players he was sold on to Derby County. He won the League Trophy with Vale in 1993, and won promotion out of the Second Division in 1993–94. He also won promotion out of the First Division with Derby in 1995–96. In 1998, he transferred to Barnsley, where he saw out his professional playing career until his retirement due to injury in 2001. He made a total of 315 appearances in a ten-year career in the English Football League.

As a coach he worked as the director of his own football school in Canada and as a senior coach for Manchester United Soccer Schools, before he was appointed manager of Newcastle Town in February 2018.

Playing career

Netherlands
Van der Laan started his career at Eerste Divisie side Schiedamse Voetbal Vereniging in 1987. The club finished in mid-table in 1987–88 and 1988–89, before winning promotion to the Eredivisie as 1989–90 Eerste Divisie champions. However he remained in the Dutch second tier as he switched to Wageningen midway through the 1989–90 season. In four years in the Netherlands he played 59 games for SVV and 27 games for Wageningen. He decided to leave his home country after picking up a 14 match ban from the Dutch leagues.

Port Vale
He was signed by English Second Division side Port Vale in February 1991 for a fee of £80,000 after impressing on trial. Initially signed as a striker, manager John Rudge converted him into a bustling, hard-tackling, goalscoring midfielder. Instantly recognisable for his mane of long blonde hair, Van der Laan soon became a popular figure with the Vale fans, his bustling style and midfield engine enabled him to settle into the English game very quickly, as he hit four goals in eighteen games in 1990–91.

He made 49 appearances in 1991–92, scoring six goals, including a strike in front of the Kop in a 2–2 League Cup draw with Liverpool. Despite his contribution, Vale were relegated, though due to the creation of the Premier League, the Third Division became the Second Division. He made 53 appearances in 1992–93, scoring ten goals, helping the "Valiants" to both the League Trophy Final and the play-off Final. Vale beat Stockport County 2–1 in the cup final at Wembley, but lost 3–0 to West Bromwich Albion in the play-off final. However he sometimes failed to make the starting eleven due to the form of central midfield rivals Andy Porter, Ian Taylor and Paul Kerr, and submitted a transfer request in February 1993 so as to find first-team football elsewhere.

Vale went on to win promotion into the First Division in 1993–94, following a second-place finish. He was again a key player at Vale Park in 1994–95, as the club retained their second tier status. However his good looks and popularity with the Vale fans saw him targeted by the more thuggish element of rivals Stoke City and he was punched in the face whilst inside a pizza and kebab house in Newcastle-under-Lyme on 18 June 1995.

Derby County
In the summer of 1995, Van der Laan was sold to Derby County for a fee of £475,000 plus Lee Mills. He was made captain by manager Jim Smith and was an influential member of the team. He scored the goal which sealed promotion to the Premier League in 1996 – this made him a permanent fan favourite. He made 21 appearances for the "Rams" in 1996–97, and also spent October and November on loan at First Division Wolverhampton Wanderers, playing seven games. Injury limited him to thirteen appearances in 1997–98, his final season at Pride Park.

Barnsley
Van der Laan signed for Barnsley in summer 1998 for a fee of £325,000. He played twenty games for the First Division club in 1998–99, scoring twice. He made 37 appearances in 1999–2000, as the "Tykes" reached the play-offs, only to lose 4–2 to Ipswich Town in the final. He played 22 games in 2000–01, before a recurring knee injury he picked up in December 2000 forced him to retire from professional football in March 2001, at the age of 32. He later played for Newcastle Town, after coming out of retirement in September 2003.

Style of play
Van der Laan spent most of his career as a box-to-box midfielder, having spent his early days as a forward. He was an excellent set-piece taker and had good hard tackling, precision passing and sharp shooting abilities.

Coaching career
Van der Laan worked as the Head International Coach for Manchester United Soccer Schools. He set up The Robin van der Laan Soccer School and Academy in Canada. He was appointed assistant manager at Newcastle Town in May 2014. He was taken ill whilst coaching for Manchester United in Saudi Arabia in May 2016 and underwent heart surgery.

On 26 February 2018, Van der Laan was appointed as manager at Newcastle Town, who were then fifth-bottom of the Northern Premier League Division One South. The "Castle" finished third-bottom at the end of the 2017–18 season, then 15th in the Division One West in 2018–19 and were 17th in the Division One South-East by the time the 2019–20 season was abandoned due to the COVID-19 pandemic in England.

Career statistics

Honours
Port Vale
Football League Trophy: 1993
Football League Second Division second-place promotion: 1993–94

Derby County
Football League First Division second-place promotion: 1995–96

References

External links
 
 The RVDL Soccer School and Academy Canada

1968 births
Living people
Footballers from Schiedam
Dutch footballers
Association football midfielders
Association football forwards
SV SVV players
FC Wageningen players
Dutch expatriate footballers
Dutch expatriate sportspeople in England
Van Der Laan, Robin
Van Der Laan, Robin
Van Der Laan, Robin
Van Der Laan, Robin
Van Der Laan, Robin
Van Der Laan, Robin
Eerste Divisie players
Van Der Laan, Robin
Van Der Laan, Robin
Association football coaches
Dutch football managers
Dutch expatriate football managers
Van Der Laan, Robin
Van Der Laan, Robin